U.S. Postal Service Pro Cycling Team was a United States-based professional road bicycle racing team.  On June 15, 2004, the Discovery Channel signed a deal to become sponsor of the team for the 2004–2007 seasons and its name changed to Discovery Channel Pro Cycling Team. From 2005 until 2007, the team was one of the 20 teams that competed in the new UCI ProTour. As part of the sponsorship deal, Lance Armstrong, the team's undisputed leader, provided on-air appearances for the Discovery Networks TV channels. The deal did not affect the rights of secondary sponsor OLN, now known as NBC Sports Network in the US, to air major cycling events such as the Tour de France, although the two channels are competitors.

The team was directed by Belgian Johan Bruyneel, who also managed U.S. Postal. The chief mechanic was Julien DeVries. The team was co-owned by Tailwind Sports Corp. of San Francisco and Capital Sports & Entertainment of Austin, Texas. On February 10, 2007, Discovery Channel announced that it would not renew its sponsorship of the team at the end of the 2007 season. On August 10, 2007, the cycling team announced that it would not search for a new sponsor, but cease operations and disband at the end of the 2007 season.

In October 2012 USADA released a report saying that the team had run "the most sophisticated, professionalised and successful doping programme the sport has ever seen". The report contained affidavits from eleven riders on the team including Frankie Andreu, Tyler Hamilton, George Hincapie, Floyd Landis, Levi Leipheimer, and others, describing their own usage of erythropoietin (EPO), blood transfusion, testosterone, and other banned practices during the Tour de France and other races. They also implicated seven-time Tour winner, Lance Armstrong. On October 22, 2012, the UCI upheld the USADA's recommendation to strip Armstrong of all results since August 1, 1998, and ban him from cycling for life. In February 2013, the US government joined Landis' False Claims Act lawsuit against Armstrong, alleging that Armstrong had defrauded the US Postal Service of sponsorship funds by violating cycling rules by using performance-enhancing drugs while riding for the team.

Team rosters

Final season
On August 10, 2007, Tailwind Sports announced the end of the Discovery Channel Pro Cycling Team. Tailwind officials stopped their search for a new title sponsor for the Discovery team, citing the current tumultuous conditions within the sport of cycling.
 Team operations continued until the end of the 2007 season.

After the 2007 season Johan Bruyneel went to rebuild Team Astana for the 2008 season. He brought with him much of Discovery's personnel, such as riders Alberto Contador, Levi Leipheimer, Yaroslav Popovych, Tomas Vaitkus, and coach Sean Yates.

The 2007 U.S. national road champion George Hincapie signed a contract for the 2008 season Team High Road, later known as Team HTC–Columbia, run by the American Bob Stapleton.

Final squad (2007) 
''As of April 30, 2007.  Ages are from August 10, 2007.

Former members of Discovery Channel

Former members of U.S. Postal

Notable wins

2005 results

2006 results

2007 results

U.S. Postal Service Pro Cycling Team history 

The US Postal Service Pro Cycling Team and later named the US Postal Service Pro Cycling Team presented by Berry Floor operated from 1996 through 2004. The United States Postal Service was the title (primary) sponsor from 1996 through 2004 and the team was nicknamed the "Blue Train". Berry Floor, a Belgian flooring company, was the secondary sponsor, also known as a Presenting Sponsor. Domestically the USPS Pro Cycling Team was presented by Alloc, the American subsidiary of Berry Floor.

Lance Armstrong won six Tours de France (1999–2004) (that were later stripped) with US Postal, and in 2003 Roberto Heras—at that time a US Postal rider—won the Vuelta a España. Armstrong went on to win a seventh Tour de France in 2005 (that was later also stripped), after the USPS contract and sponsorship ended.

The US Postal Service announced that it would cease sponsorship at the end of the 2004 racing season when its eight-year contract expired. It had previously been under fire for the expenditure from organizations such as Postal Watch, a website critical of the United States Postal Service. Legitimate problems of mismanagement and sloppy accounting were pointed out by the Postal Service itself, via the USPS Office of the Inspector General. Before the expiration of the USPS contract, Armstrong insisted that he would only continue to ride with the USPS team structure. This demand was met on June 15, 2004, when Discovery Networks stepped in and agreed to sponsor the team for the next three years as the Discovery Channel Pro Cycling Team.

1996 results 

With the help of Thomas Weisel and Eddie Borysewicz, the United States Postal Service begins its reign as title sponsor to what has become the most successful cycling team from the United States. Borysewicz served as the team's directeur sportif and the team raced mainly in domestic events in the United States.

1997 results 

Thomas Weisel brought in Mark Gorski, the 1984 Olympic Gold Medalist in the Men's 1000 m Sprint (Scratch) event, as team manager. Due in large part to Russian Viatcheslav Ekimov and his key stage wins at Paris–Nice and the Critérium du Dauphiné Libéré, the USPS squad got its first invitation to ride in the Tour de France.

1998 results 

Lance Armstrong joined the US Postal team in late 1997, when returning to professional cycling following his cancer treatments.

1999 results

2000 results

2001 results 
In 2001, the U.S. Postal Service Pro Cycling Team was named the USOC Team of the Year. Also, Armstrong was named USOC SportsMan of the Year, which he also won in 1999.

2002 results

2003 results

2004 results

Early history and notable wins

1988–1989 – Sunkyong (Amateur) 

Eddie Borysewicz, known as "Eddy B", was the road coach of a pro/amateur cycling team formed by George Taylor and sponsored by Sunkyong, a South Korea-based manufacturing and industrial conglomerate. At the 1984 Summer Olympics, Borysewicz served as the U.S. Olympic Cycling Coach and led American cyclists to an unprecedented nine Olympic medals.

1992–1994 – Subaru–Montgomery 

Subaru and Montgomery Securities, led by Thomas Weisel, serve as co-title sponsors.

1995 – Montgomery-Bell 

Montgomery Securities Chief Executive Thomas W. Weisel, an avid cyclist, continued his support for cycling.

Sponsors 
The following companies and organizations served as sponsors for the 2007 squad:

 Discovery Channel
 AMD
 24 Hour Fitness
 Trek
 Nike, Inc.
 Thomas Weisel Partners
 Škoda Auto
 Mio Technology Europe
 Bissell
 Bontrager
 Shimano
 Giro
 PowerBar
 Carmichael Training Systems
 1st Endurance
 Tacx
 Hutchinson
 FRS Antioxidant Energy
 
 Park Tool USA
 Sci Con
 Sapim Race Spokes
 SRM
 Maximize

References

External links

Cycling teams based in the United States
Defunct cycling teams based in the United States
Former UCI WorldTeams
United States Postal Service
Discovery Channel
Cycling teams established in 1988
Cycling teams disestablished in 2007
1988 establishments in the United States
2007 disestablishments in the United States